The Chinese Taipei national rugby sevens team is a minor national sevens side. They have competed in the Hong Kong Sevens since the 1980s. In 1989, veteran rugby commentator Bill McLaren mentions them in an article on the Hong Kong Sevens, saying that their team had two Chi-Mings, a Yen-Ching, and a Chijen-Shuen, and that he was grateful that he did not have to broadcast all the names, as he had trouble remembering them.

Record

Summer Olympics

Rugby World Cup Sevens

Hong Kong Sevens

Sri Lanka Rugby 7s

Asian Games

References
 McLaren, Bill A Visit to Hong Kong in Starmer-Smith, Nigel & Robertson, Ian (eds) The Whitbread Rugby World '90 (Lennard Books, 1989)

Rugby union in Taiwan
Chinese Taipei national rugby union team
National rugby sevens teams